Valentyna Ivakhnenko and Marina Melnikova were the defending champions, but Ivakhnenko chose not to participate. Melnikova partnered up with Sofia Shapatava, but they lost in the quarterfinals to Réka-Luca Jani and Teodora Mirčić.

Mailen Auroux and María Irigoyen won the title, defeating Jani and Mirčić in the final, 5–7, 6–4, [10–8].

Seeds

Draw

References 
 Main draw

Save Cup - Doubles
Save Cup
2012 in Italian tennis